Raw Glory is a British rock band, formed in 1994 as the vehicle for accomplished professional musicians Mick Underwood, Gary Davis, John Savage and Peter Taylor

Biography 
Underwood began his career with The Outlaws in 1961 and has been one of the most influential figures in the British rock genre ever since, along the way playing in The Herd (with Peter Frampton), Episode Six, Quatermass, Peace with Paul Rodgers, Strapps, Gillan (with four UK top twenty albums, two of which were top three), and Quatermass II. Beginning with famed producer Joe Meek, Underwood has also performed as a session musician on hundreds of recordings.

Guitarist Cosmo also started working professionally in the 1960s when he was just thirteen years old, playing some of the legendary circuit venues such as The Marquee and the Star-Club in Hamburg, Germany. He further established his reputation during the 1970s, touring extensively in the U.K. and U.S. with The Heavy Metal Kids, former Jimi Hendrix band member Curtis Knight, Frankie Miller, Free's Andy Fraser, Phil Lynott of Thin Lizzy, Sweet's Brian Connolly  and the Jordanaires (Elvis Presley's backing group). Cosmo retired from the music business but was persuaded to return to performing by manager Peter Grant who had been listening to old demos he had recorded.

Glaswegian Heywood first worked with Underwood in Quatermass II, along with former Deep Purple bassist Nick Simper, originally as singer only, though he took on the bass duties as well when Simper left to concentrate on his band The Good Old Boys. Heywood established his credentials working with The Pretty Things' Phil May, Gary Barden, Hot Chocolate's Harvey Hinsley, and touring Europe and Britain with John Coghlan's Quo. Heywood has also headlined at the Cavern Club in Liverpool.

After the departure of Heywood, the Raw Glory line-up was completed by singer Paul Manzi, and bass player Ronnie Garrity (who had previously worked with ex-Thin Lizzy member Eric Bell). In 2012, Mick Underwood walked out to form Mick Underwood's Glory Road, a covers band from his Gillan era.

The 2021 lineup features PJ Phillips bass/vocals and Keith Boyce (Heavy Metal Kids) on drums.

Personnel
Current Line-Up
 Cosmo — Guitar.
 Paul Manzi — Lead Vocals.
 PJ Phillips — Bass and vocals.
 Keith Boyce — Drums

Past-members
Andy Hodge — Bass and vocals.
Ronnie Garrity — Bass and vocals.
Mick Underwood — Drums.
 Les Binks — Drums.

Discography
City Life (2007)

External links
 Official site

British hard rock musical groups
Musical groups established in 2006
2006 establishments in England